Alka is a Norwegian islet between Gassen and Havella in Menkeøyane, part of Thousand Islands, an archipelago south of Edgeøya.

References

 Norwegian Polar Institute Place Names of Svalbard Database

Islands of Svalbard